Equestrianism made its Pan American Games debut at the first Pan American Games in 1951 in Buenos Aires, Argentina.  It has appeared at every Pan American Games since.  The current Pan American Games equestrian disciplines are Dressage, Eventing, and Jumping.  In each discipline, both individual and team medals are awarded. Women and men compete together on equal terms.

Equestrian disciplines and the equestrian component of Modern Pentathlon are also the only Pan American Games events that involve animals.  The horse is considered as much an athlete as the rider.

The International Governing Body for equestrian sports  is the Fédération Équestre Internationale (FEI).

Eventing
In 1991 in Havana and 2003 in Santo Domingo the eventing competition were not held. Rather, a Pan American Eventing Championship was held in Chatsworth, Georgia, United States in 1991 and in 2003 the competition was held in Fair Hill in 2003.

Medal table
Some events did not have silver and/or bronze medalists.

References

 
Sports at the Pan American Games
Pan American Games
Pan American Games
Pan American Games